Oron District was one of the districts of the Canton of Vaud, Switzerland.

Mergers and name changes
 On 1 January 2003 the former municipality of La Rogivue merged into the municipality of Maracon.  
 On 1 September 2006 the municipalities of Bussigny-sur-Oron, Châtillens, Chesalles-sur-Oron, Les Cullayes, Ecoteaux, Essertes, Ferlens, Maracon, Mézières, Montpreveyres, Oron-la-Ville, Oron-le-Châtel, Palézieux, Servion, Les Tavernes, Les Thioleyres, and Vuibroye  came from the District d'Oron to join the Lavaux-Oron District. 
 On 1 September 2006 the municipalities of Carrouge, Corcelles-le-Jorat, Ropraz, and Vulliens came from the District d'Oron to join the Broye-Vully District.
 On 1 September 2006 the municipality of Peney-le-Jorat came from the District d'Oron to join the Gros-de-Vaud District.

Municipalities
Bussigny-sur-Oron 
Carrouge
Châtillens
Chesalles-sur-Oron 
Corcelles-le-Jorat
Ecoteaux
Essertes 
Ferlens 
La Rogivue
Les Cullayes
Les Tavernes 
Les Thioleyres
Maracon
Mézières
Montpreveyres
Oron-la-Ville
Oron-le-Châtel
Palézieux
Peney-le-Jorat
Ropraz
Servion
Vuibroye
Vulliens

References

Former districts of the canton of Vaud